Inferno (alternatively known as Desert Heat) is a 1999 American action film directed by John G. Avildsen, and starring Jean-Claude van Damme, Danny Trejo and Pat Morita. This was the last film directed by Avildsen before his death in 2017.

Eddie Lomax (Van Damme) is a veteran soldier sick of life, wandering the desert looking for a reason to die. An incident with a few thugs from the nearby town, who steal Eddie's motorbike and beat him almost to death, sets him on a path of revenge.

Plot
Eddie Lomax (Jean-Claude van Damme) drives an Indian motorcycle in an open desert plain (referred to as the Dry Lake). Soon, the motorcycle breaks down and Eddie dismounts, carrying nothing but his jacket, his .45 pistol, and a bottle of tequila. As he lies in the desert drinking, he eventually sees his friend Johnny Sixtoes (Danny Trejo), a Mexican Indian, to whom he had sent a postcard notifying him of his arrival.

In their conversation Eddie reveals that the surprise he wrote about in the letter was, in fact, the Indian motorcycle. He also reveals that he is there to kill himself as he goes into a drunken rage, revealing deep regret from their days in the Army, claiming that the souls of those he killed haunt him. Firing shots off in all directions, he vents his buried feelings to Johnny, and hopes he will "give him the OK to take a journey".

Soon after the shots are fired, a truck pulls up to Eddie, Johnny disappears, and it becomes clear that Eddie was hallucinating about him being present. Matt (Shark Fralick), Jesse (Silas Weir Mitchell), and Petey Hogan (Jonathan Avildsen), sons of Ramsey Hogan (Larry Drake) get out of the truck, Matt furious as one of Eddie's drunken shots almost killed him.

Eddie staggers to them, not wanting any trouble; Matt, however, insists that he apologise. Matt then proposes that they take the motorcycle, and they will forget about the gunshot. Eddie persists that the motorcycle is a gift for his friend, telling Matt to get off. Matt seems to comply, until he delivers a cheap blow to Eddie. After a fight, Eddie is left beaten and shot in his right shoulder. As the brothers stand over Eddie, another truck passes with a local restaurant waitress Dottie (Jaime Pressly) and cook Vern (Kevin West). Dottie expresses extreme concern; Vern simply drives on, not wanting any trouble from the Hogans. Matt begins to load the motorcycle onto the truck, instructing Jesse to make sure that Eddie is dead.

Jesse asks for Eddie's gun from Pete, who took it from the earlier struggle. Being the youngest of the three, Petey insists on doing the job. As Jesse and Matt load the motorcycle, Petey aims at Eddie's head. Eddie's eyes open briefly, which makes Petey uneasy. Two shots ring out, which make Matt and Jesse think that Pete shot Eddie twice. However, Petey froze and simply shot two rounds into the ground.

Johnny Six Toes finds Eddie and nurses him back to health. Eddie then comes back to town to recover his pistol from Leon (Gregory Scott Cummins) and Lester (Neil Delama) in the pawn shop by killing them. Eddie falls for Rhonda Reynolds (Gabrielle Fitzpatrick), the other waitress, and enlists the help of Jubal Early (Pat Morita) to help him dispose of the bodies.

Eddie then sets the two rival gangs against each other in a bloody path to recover his prized motorcycle for Johnny, have his revenge on the Hogans, and ultimately find a reason to carry on living. Eddie defeats Matt and is once again on the road with Johnny, riding with Rhonda.

Cast

Production

Filming
Variety reported that filming started in June 1998 and had a planned schedule of eight weeks. The original cut of the film was known as Coyote Moon. Van Damme did not like this cut and had the film recut. Avildsen unsuccessfully attempted to have his name removed from the film.

Release

Home media 
On July 1, 2002 DVD was released by Columbia TriStar Home Video at the UK in Region 2.

On September 20, 2010 Jean-Claude Van Damme ten movie collection DVD was released; including nine action films they were: No Retreat, No Surrender, Nowhere to Run, Hard Target, Street Fighter, Sudden Death, The Quest, Double Team, Knock Off and Universal Soldier: The Return.

Reception

Critical response
Larry Powell and Tom Garrett wrote in The Films of John G. Avildsen that "reviews were scarce and the few that did get published were cruel." Rotten Tomatoes, a review aggregator, reports that 0% of five surveyed critics gave the film a positive review; the average rating was 3/10.

References

External links 
 
 
 
Inferno at Papystreaming

1999 films
1999 action films
American action films
Films scored by Bill Conti
Films set in Louisiana
American films about revenge
Films shot in California
Films directed by John G. Avildsen
Films produced by Jean-Claude Van Damme
Patricide in fiction
1990s English-language films
1990s American films